Prior to the landmark ruling United States v. Windsor, the constitutionality of banning same-sex marriage was upheld by the Eighth Circuit in Citizens for Equal Protection v. Bruning. After the Windsor ruling, many same-sex marriage bans were struck down by lower courts. The Tenth, Fourth, Seventh, and Ninth circuits all ruled that same-sex marriage bans were unconstitutional. The cases that made it to these circuit courts originated in district courts, which for the most part, also struck down same-sex marriage bans. When a circuit court struck down a state's same-sex marriage ban, it did not directly or immediately strike down same-sex marriage bans in other states within the circuit court’s jurisdiction. However, it paved the way for same-sex marriage bans to be struck down in the entire circuit, due to the precedent it set for district courts within the circuit to follow. In some states, same-sex marriage was already legal before their federal circuit court ruled on the matter.

The Sixth Circuit ruled that same-sex marriage bans were not unconstitutional and reversed the district court rulings that struck down same-sex marriage bans. Since this was the only circuit court to rule this way post-Windsor, this created a circuit split which ultimately led to the Supreme Court of the United States deciding to resolve the issue once and for all. The Supreme Court ruled that same-sex marriage bans violate the constitution, in the landmark ruling Obergefell v. Hodges, which was the consolidated case with cases originating from each state in the Sixth Circuit. Some circuit courts have not ruled on the constitutionality of same-sex marriage bans at all. Some circuit courts had pending same-sex marriage cases, but decided to hold off on rendering a decision  until the Supreme Court ruled on the matter.

See also 
 Same-sex marriage under United States tribal jurisdictions

References 

United States courts of appeals